Musiktheater Füssen is a theatre in the town of Füssen in Bavaria, Germany dedicated to musical performances related to King Ludwig II of Bavaria.

Theatres in Bavaria
Füssen